The Socata TB 30 Epsilon is a light military trainer aircraft produced by SOCATA (then part of Aérospatiale). It is a tandem two-seater with a metal airframe. The first prototype flew on 22 December 1979.

Design and development
In 1978, the French Air Force (Armée de l'Air) published a requirement for a new basic trainer aircraft to partially replace the Fouga Magister in the early parts of the syllabus for pilot training.  The new aircraft was expected to have tandem seating, be powered by a 224 kW (300 hp) piston engine and have a three-hour endurance.  Similar designs were proposed by the SOCATA subsidiary of Aérospatiale (based on their TB 10 Tobago light aircraft) and by GEPAL (the GEPAL Mk II). The SOCATA proposal, the TB 30B, was chosen in February 1979.

The first of two prototypes flew on 22 December 1979, but testing showed that the Epsilon had poor handling and it was redesigned with a new swept back fin supplemented by a ventral strake and a larger tailplane, while the wing was fitted with elliptical tips increasing the wingspan from 7.40 m (24 ft 3 in) to 7.59 m (24 ft 11 in). The first prototype flew again with these changes on 31 October 1980, and it was soon found that the handling problems had been fixed.

The Epsilon is a low winged cantilever monoplane of all metal construction. It is powered by a Lycoming O-540 flat-six piston engine driving a two-blade propeller, and is fitted with a retractable nosewheel undercarriage. The pilot and instructor are sat in tandem under a sliding Plexiglas canopy, with cockpit layout designed to aid transition to the Dassault/Dornier Alpha Jet to which French students graduate after completing the Epsilon part of their training syllabus.

The first prototype was modified into a testbed for the Turbomeca TP 319 Arrius turboprop engine, flying in this form on 9 November 1985. The testbed was then modified into a dedicated turboprop trainer, the TB 31 Oméga, powered by a 360 kW (483 shp) Arrius 1A2 and fitted with ejection seats, returning to flight on 30 April 1989. While it was offered for the United States Air Force/United States Navy Joint Primary Aircraft Training System competition to replace the Beechcraft T-34 Mentor and Cessna T-37 Tweet, it was rejected, with no sales resulting.

Operational history
The Armée de l'Air placed an initial order for 30 Epsilons in 1981, with further contracts following with a total of 150 ordered. First deliveries started in 1983, with the first training courses based on the Epsilon starting in September 1984.

Export orders were received from Togo for three armed Epsilons in 1984, delivered in 1986 (with a fourth supplied later to replace a crashed aircraft) and from Portugal in 1987 for 18 aircraft, to be assembled in Portugal by OGMA.

Variants
 TB 30 Epsilon: Military trainer aircraft
 TB 31 Oméga: Proposed turboprop powered version of the TB 30 Epsilon. Only one aircraft built

Operators

 Portuguese Air Force - 16 in service (2012)

 Senegalese Air Force - 2 in service (2012) 

 Togolese Air Force - 3 in service (2012)

Former operators

 French Air Force - 34 in service (2012) withdrawn from service by 2019.

Specifications

See also

References

Notes

Bibliography
 "Directory: World's Air Forces". Flight International, 11–17 November 2008, pp. 52–76. 
 Donald, David. The Encyclopedia of World Aircraft. Etobicoke, Ontario: Prospero Books, 1997, pp. 19–20. .
 Hoyle, Craig.  "Directory: World Air Forces". Flight International, Vol. 178, No. 5257, 14–20 September 2010, pp. 26–53.
 Hoyle, Craig. "World Air Forces Directory". Flight International, Vol. 182, No. 5370, 11–17 December 2012. pp. 40–64.
 Jackson, Paul. "Epsilon ... The Tractable Trainer from Tarbes". Air International, Volume 32, No. 1, January 1987, pp. 7–15. ISSN 0306-5634.
 Lambert, Mark. Jane's All The World's Aircraft 1990–91. Coulsdon, UK: Jane's Defence Data, 1990. .
 Lambert, Mark. Jane's All The World's Aircraft 1993–94. Coulsdon, UK: Jane's Data Division, 1993. .

 Taylor, John W.R. Jane's All The World's Aircraft 1988-89. Coulsdon, UK: Jane's Defence Data, 1988. .

External links

Epsilon
1970s French military trainer aircraft
Single-engined tractor aircraft
Low-wing aircraft
Aircraft first flown in 1979